Water mirror may refer to: 
 A water-based specular reflection
 The drainage basin of a reservoir or lake
 Reflecting pool, an ornamental shallow pool of water having a reflective surface 
 Miroir d'eau, a specific reflecting pool located across from the Place de la Bourse in Bordeaux
 A hào (pseudonym) for Sima Hui